The Little Spreewald Maiden is an American silent film produced by Kalem Company and directed by Sidney Olcott with him and Gene Gauntier in the leading roles.

Cast
 Gene Gauntier - Frieda, the Spreewald maiden
 Sidney Olcott - Hans, her sweetheart

Production notes
The film is shot in 1910, at Raddusch Spreewald, along the river Spree in Germany and in New York.

External links

 The Little Spreewald Maiden website dedicated to Sidney Olcott

1910 films
Silent American drama films
American silent short films
Films set in Germany
Films shot in Germany
Films directed by Sidney Olcott
1910 short films
1910 drama films
American black-and-white films
1910s American films